European junior records in the sport of athletics are ratified by the European Athletics Association (EAA). Athletics records comprise the best performance of an athlete before the year of their 20th birthday. Technically, in all under-20 age divisions, the age is calculated "on December 31 of the year of competition" to avoid age group switching during a competitive season.

Outdoor
Key:

h = hand timing

X = unratified due to inadequate doping control

Mx = mixed race

OT = oversized track (> 200 m in circumference)

Men

Women

Indoor

Men

Women

Notes

References
General
European U20 Records 12 February 2023 updated
Specific

junior
European